Jaisen Jaren Clifford (born 4 February 1996) is a South African soccer player who plays as a forward for Van.

Career

In 2015, Clifford signed for Maltese second tier side Gudja United. In 2017, he signed for Stumbras in the Lithuanian top flight, helping them win the 2017 Lithuanian Football Cup, their only major trophy. In 2019, he signed for Portuguese third tier club Condeixa. Before the second half of 2020–21, Clifford signed for Cape Town All Stars in the South African second tier, where he made 5 appearances and scored 1 goal. On 4 February 2021, he debuted for Cape Town All Stars during a 3–1 win over Bizana Pondo Chiefs. On 4 February 2021, Clifford scored his first goal for Cape Town All Stars during a 3–1 win over Bizana Pondo Chiefs. Before the second half of 2021–22, he signed for Armenian team Van.

References

External links
 Jaisen Clifford at playmakerstats.com

1996 births
Association football forwards
Campeonato de Portugal (league) players
Cape Town All Stars players
Expatriate footballers in Armenia
Expatriate footballers in Lithuania
Expatriate footballers in Malta
Expatriate footballers in Portugal
FC Stumbras players
FC Van players
Gudja United F.C. players
Living people
Maltese Challenge League players
Mqabba F.C. players
National First Division players
South African expatriate soccer players
South African expatriate sportspeople in Lithuania
South African expatriate sportspeople in Portugal
South African expatriate sportspeople in Malta
South African soccer players
Sportspeople from Mpumalanga